Gympie–Brooloo–Kenilworth Road is a continuous  road route in the Gympie and Sunshine Coast regions of Queensland, Australia. It has two official names, Gympie–Brooloo Road and Kenilworth–Brooloo Road. The entire route is signed as State Route 51.

Gympie–Brooloo Road (number 483) is a state-controlled district road and Kenilworth–Brooloo Road (number 481) is  also a state-controlled district road.

Gympie–Brooloo Road is known locally (with Local and State Government approval) as Mary Valley Road.

Route description
The road commences as Gympie–Brooloo Road (Mary Valley Road) at an intersection with the Bruce Highway (A1) in Gympie. It crosses the Mary River and runs generally south, following the Mary River Valley. After running through the eastern corner of the residential locality of  the road passes through or by rich farming land in a number of localities. It next turns south-east then south through . The village of Amamoor is well to the west of the road, on the former railway line. In Amamoor the Mary Valley Link Road branches off to the east. In Imbil the Tuchekoi Road branches off to the east, and Yabba Creek Road  runs to the west.

At Brooloo the road changes to Kenilworth–Brooloo Road, running south and south-east to Kenilworth, where it ends at an intersection with the Eumundi–Kenilworth Road, which branches off to the east. Eumundi–Kenilworth Road continues south as Elizabeth Street, with no route number other than Tourist Drive 22, to an intersection with Charles Street. From there the road (and Tourist Drive 22) continues south as Maleny–Kenilworth Road.

Tourist Drive 42
Tourist Drive 42 is concurrent with most of Gympie–Brooloo Road, leaving it at Kandanga to follow Kandanga–Imbil Road to Imbil on its way to Borumba Dam. On returning from the dam it rejoins at Imbil and runs north a short distance before turning south-east to Tuchekoi.

History

Pastoral leases were taken up in the Fraser Coast Region from 1843, and European settlement of what is now Gympie began soon after. The Gympie district was part of the large Widgee Widgee pastoral area. In 1887,  of land were resumed from the Widgee Widgee pastoral run for the establishment of small farms. Further south,  were resumed from Imbil. The land was offered for selection on 17 April 1887. The opening of new farms on the western side of the Mary River to the south of Gympie led to the development of roads in the Mary Valley.

A pastoral lease was taken up as Kenilworth Station in 1850. The effects of the 1884 Land Act  reached the Kenilworth area in 1888, when land on grazing properties was surveyed and made available for selection. Development of small farms in the Imbil and Kenilworth areas led to the need for a road to transport products to Gympie, and also requests for a railway line. The road was completed quickly, but a railway did not arrive until 1914-15. Meanwhile, further road improvements had been undertaken.

Upgrades
A project to design active transport crossings, at a cost of $1.3 million, was to be completed in July 2022.

Major intersections
All distances are from Google Maps.

See also

 List of road routes in Queensland
 List of numbered roads in Queensland
 Widgee
 Mary Valley Railway Cream Sheds#History, for a detailed description of the growth of dairying and other rural industries in the Mary Valley in the late 1800's.

Notes

References

Roads in Queensland